Amfitriti is a village in Evros regional unit, East Macedonia and Thrace, Greece.

References 

Alexandroupolis
Populated places in Evros (regional unit)